KOOT (88.1 FM) is a defunct non-commercial educational radio station formerly licensed to serve Hurley, New Mexico, United States. The station, which began broadcasting in 2009, was owned by Community Access Television of Silver.  It broadcast a community radio format.

History
This station received its original construction permit for a new FM station broadcasting at 88.1 MHz from the Federal Communications Commission on October 31, 2008.  The new station was assigned the call letters KOOT by the FCC on February 10, 2009.

KOOT filed an application for a license to cover which was accepted for filing by the FCC on April 6, 2009.  The station began broadcasting under a special temporary authority from the FCC on April 22, 2009.

On October 20, 2016, the station's owner surrendered KOOT's license to the FCC for cancellation. The FCC cancelled KOOT's license on December 28, 2016.

References

External links

OOT
Radio stations established in 2010
Grant County, New Mexico
2010 establishments in New Mexico
Defunct radio stations in the United States
Radio stations disestablished in 2016
2016 disestablishments in New Mexico
Defunct community radio stations in the United States
OOT